Hurry Sundown is the third album by American southern rock band Outlaws, released in 1977. The title track became a concert staple and fan favorite. Four members of the band, Hughie Thomasson, Henry Paul, Billy Jones, and Harvey Dalton Arnold (who replaced Frank O'Keefe on bass) contributed songwriting and lead vocals. Paul would leave the band after the album's release.

Thomasson plays pedal steel on some tracks, and banjo on the bluegrass track "So Afraid".

Track listing
"Gunsmoke" (Henry Paul, Monte Yoho) – 4:18
"Hearin' My Heart Talkin'" (Tim Martin, Walter Meskell) – 4:11
"So Afraid" (Harvey Dalton Arnold) – 3:17
"Holiday" (Billy Jones) – 4:02
"Hurry Sundown" (Hughie Thomasson) – 4:05
"Cold and Lonesome" (Arnold) – 3:19
"Night Wines" (Jones) – 4:50
"Heavenly Blues" (Paul) – 3:47
"Man of the Hour" (Jones, Thomasson) – 6:12

Personnel
Harvey Dalton Arnold - bass, guitar, vocals
Billy Jones - electric guitar, vocals
Henry Paul - guitar, vocals
Hughie Thomasson - acoustic, electric, and pedal steel guitars; banjo; vocals
Monte Yoho - drums

Guests
Manual Labour - percussion
Joe Vitale - ARP synthesizer, strings

Production
Ed Mashal - producer, engineer
Bill Szymczyk - producer, engineer

Charts

Notes

References

Outlaws (band) albums
1977 albums
Albums produced by Bill Szymczyk
Arista Records albums
Albums with cover art by James Flournoy Holmes